Colmar is a commune in France.

Colmar may also refer to:

Colmar, Illinois, USA
Colmar, Kentucky, USA
Colmar, Pennsylvania, USA
Colmar-Berg, a commune and town in Luxembourg
Colmar station (disambiguation), stations of the name